This is a list of Superfund sites in Montana designated under the Comprehensive Environmental Response, Compensation, and Liability Act (CERCLA) environmental law.  The CERCLA federal law of 1980 authorized the United States Environmental Protection Agency (EPA) to create a list of polluted locations requiring a long-term response to clean up hazardous material contaminations.   These locations are known as Superfund sites, and are placed on the National Priorities List (NPL).  The NPL guides the EPA in "determining which sites warrant further investigation" for environmental remediation.  As of March 10, 2011, there were 16 Superfund sites on the National Priorities List in Montana.  One additional site has been proposed for entry on the list.  No sites have yet been removed from the list following clean up.

Superfund sites

See also
List of Superfund sites in the United States
List of environmental issues
List of waste types
TOXMAP

References

External links
EPA (region 8) list of Superfund sites in Montana
EPA list of proposed Superfund sites in Montana
EPA list of current Superfund sites in Montana
EPA list of Superfund site construction completions in Montana
EPA list of partially deleted Superfund sites in Montana
EPA list of deleted Superfund sites in Montana
Butte Citizens Technical Environmental Committee (CTEC), a Superfund Technical Assistance group for the complex of Superfund sites around Butte and the Clark Fork River

Montana
Superfund